Béni Mered or Beni Marad is a town and commune in Blida Province, Algeria. As of the 1998 census it had a population of 21,457.

References

Communes of Blida Province